Senin Sebai (born 18 December 1993) is an Ivorian professional footballer who plays as a striker for Israeli club Ironi Kiryat Shmona.

Career
In 2014, he joined Moldovan side Saxan. In March 2015, he was loaned to Romanian Astra Giurgiu until the end of the season. In the summer of 2015, he joined Belarusian FC Slutsk.

On 21 June 2017, Sebai signed a one-year contract with FC Baltika Kaliningrad. On 8 June 2018, he signed a one-year contract with another Russian club, FC Tambov.

In February 2019, he moved to FC Tobol.

On 4 January 2021, he moved to FC Khimki on a free transfer. Khimki officially confirmed the transfer on 15 January 2021.

On 7 September 2021, he moved to FC Akhmat Grozny, also in the Russian Premier League. Sebai left Akhmat on 31 May 2022 upon the expiration of his contract.

On 7 June 2022, Sebai signed a three-year contract with Ironi Kiryat Shmona in Israel.

Career statistics

Club

References

1993 births
Living people
Ivorian footballers
Association football forwards
Footballers from Abidjan
FC Saxan players
FC Astra Giurgiu players
FC Slutsk players
FC Baltika Kaliningrad players
FC Tobol players
FC Tambov players
FC Khimki players
FC Akhmat Grozny players
Hapoel Ironi Kiryat Shmona F.C. players
Moldovan Super Liga players
Liga I players
Belarusian Premier League players
Russian First League players
Kazakhstan Premier League players
Russian Premier League players
Ivorian expatriate footballers
Expatriate footballers in Moldova
Ivorian expatriate sportspeople in Moldova
Expatriate footballers in Romania
Ivorian expatriate sportspeople in Romania
Expatriate footballers in Belarus
Ivorian expatriate sportspeople in Belarus
Expatriate footballers in Russia
Ivorian expatriate sportspeople in Russia
Expatriate footballers in Kazakhstan
Ivorian expatriate sportspeople in Kazakhstan
Expatriate footballers in Israel
Ivorian expatriate sportspeople in Israel